1918 Aiguillon provisional designation , is a dark asteroid from the outer region of the asteroid belt, approximately 20 kilometers in diameter.

It was discovered by French astronomer Guy Soulié at Bordeaux Observatory, France, on 19 October 1968. The asteroid was named for the French town of Aiguillon.

Orbit and classification 

Aiguillon orbits the Sun in the outer main-belt at a distance of 2.8–3.6 AU once every 5 years and 9 months (2,085 days). Its orbit has an eccentricity of 0.13 and an inclination of 9° with respect to the ecliptic. The first observation was a precovery taken at Palomar Observatory in 1954, extending the body's observation arc by 14 years prior to its official discovery observation.

Physical characteristics 

According to the survey carried out by NASA's Wide-field Infrared Survey Explorer with its subsequent NEOWISE mission, Aiguillon measures 19.5 kilometers in diameter, and its surface has an albedo of 0.062.

Based on a generic magnitude-diameter conversion, the body measures between 12 and 28 kilometers, for an albedo in the range of 0.05 to 0.25 and an absolute magnitude of 11.7. As of 2017, Aiguillons composition, rotation period and shape remain unknown.

Naming 

This minor planet was named for the discoverer's birthplace, Aiguillon, a small town on the Garonne river in France. The approved naming citation was published by the Minor Planet Center on 1 December 1979.

References

External links 
 Asteroid Lightcurve Database (LCDB), query form (info )
 Dictionary of Minor Planet Names, Google books
 Asteroids and comets rotation curves, CdR – Observatoire de Genève, Raoul Behrend
 Discovery Circumstances: Numbered Minor Planets (1)-(5000) – Minor Planet Center
 
 

Background asteroids
Aiguillon
Aiguillon
19681019